National Institutes of Health Director's Pioneer Award is a research initiative first announced in 2004 designed to support individual scientists' biomedical research. The focus is specifically on "pioneering" research that is highly innovative and has a potential to produce paradigm shifting results. 
The awards, made annually from the National Institutes of Health common fund, are each worth $500,000 per year, or $2,500,000 for five years.

Recipients

2004
Source: NIH
Larry Abbott
George Q. Daley
Homme W. Hellinga
Joseph McCune
Steven L. McKnight
Rob Phillips
Stephen R. Quake
Chad Mirkin
Xiaoliang Sunney Xie

2005
Source: NIH
Vicki L. Chandler
Hollis T. Cline
Leda Cosmides
Titia de Lange
Karl Deisseroth
Pehr A.B. Harbury
Erich D. Jarvis
Thomas A. Rando
Derek J. Smith
Giulio Tononi
Clare M. Waterman-Storer
Nathan Wolfe
Junying Yuan

2006
Source: NIH
Kwabena A. Boahen
Arup K. Chakraborty
Lila M. Gierasch
Rebecca W. Heald
Karla Kirkegaard
Thomas J. Kodadek
Cheng Chi Lee
Evgeny A. Nudler
Gary J. Pielak
David A. Relman
Rosalind A Segal
James L. Sherley
Younan Xia

2007
Source: NIH
Lisa Feldman Barrett
Peter Bearman
Emery N. Brown
Thomas R. Clandinin
James J. Collins
Margaret Gardel
Takao K. Hensch
Marshall S. Horwitz
Rustem F. Ismagilov
Frances E. Jensen
Mark J. Schnitzer
Gina Turrigiano

2008
Source: NIH
James K. Chen, Ph.D., Stanford University
Ricardo Dolmetsch, Ph.D., Stanford University
James Eberwine, Ph.D., University of Pennsylvania
Joshua M. Epstein, Ph.D., Brookings Institution
Bruce A. Hay, Ph.D., California Institute of Technology
Ann Hochschild, Ph.D., Harvard Medical School
Charles M. Lieber, Ph.D., Harvard University
Barry London, M.D., Ph.D., University of Pittsburgh
Tom Maniatis, Ph.D., Harvard University
Teri W. Odom, Ph.D., Northwestern University
Hongkun Park, Ph.D., Harvard University
Aviv Regev, Ph.D., Massachusetts Institute of Technology/Broad Institute
Aravinthan D.T. Samuel, Ph.D., Harvard University
Saeed Tavazoie, Ph.D., Princeton University
Alice Y. Ting, Ph.D., Massachusetts Institute of Technology
Alexander van Oudenaarden, Ph.D., Massachusetts Institute of Technology

2009
Source: NIH
Ivor J. Benjamin, University of Utah School of Medicine
Ajay Chawla, Stanford University
Chang-Zheng Chen, Stanford University
Hilde Cheroutre, La Jolla Institute for Immunology
Markus W. Covert, Stanford University
Joseph M. DeSimone, University of North Carolina at Chapel Hill/North Carolina State University
Sylvia M. Evans, University of California, San Diego
Joseph R. Fetcho, Cornell University
Timothy E. Holy, Washington University School of Medicine
Tannishtha Reya, Duke University
Gene E. Robinson, University of Illinois at Urbana-Champaign
Susan M. Rosenberg, Baylor College of Medicine
Leona D. Samson, Massachusetts Institute of Technology
Nirao M. Shah, University of California, San Francisco
Krishna V. Shenoy, Stanford University
Sarah A. Tishkoff, University of Pennsylvania
Alexander J. Travis, Cornell University State College of Veterinary Medicine
Jin Zhang, Johns Hopkins University School of Medicine

2010
Source: NIH
Carlos F. Barbas III, Ph.D., Scripps Research
Pamela J. Bjorkman, Ph.D., California Institute of Technology
Valentin Dragoi, Ph.D., University of Texas, Health Science Center at Houston
Stephen W. Fesik, Ph.D., Vanderbilt University School of Medicine
Tamas L. Horvath, D.V.M., Ph.D., Yale School of Medicine
J. Keith Joung, M.D., Ph.D., Massachusetts General Hospital / Harvard Medical School
David Kleinfeld, Ph.D., University of California, San Diego
Haifan Lin, Ph.D., Yale University
Jun O. Liu, Ph.D., Johns Hopkins University School of Medicine
Andres Villu Maricq, M.D., Ph.D., University of Utah
Joseph H. Nadeau, Ph.D., Institute for Systems Biology
Lalita Ramakrishnan, M.D., Ph.D., University of Washington
Lorna W. Role, Ph.D., Stony Brook University
Michael L. Roukes, Ph.D., California Institute of Technology
Ram Samudrala, Ph.D., University of Washington
Bruce A. Yankner, M.D., Ph.D., Harvard Medical School

2011
Source: NIH
Utpal Banerjee, Ph.D., University of California, Los Angeles
Brenda L. Bass, Ph.D., University of Utah
Jean Bennett, Ph.D., University of Pennsylvania
William M. Clemons, Ph.D., California Institute of Technology
Florian Engert, Ph.D., Harvard University
Andrew P. Feinberg, M.D., M.P.H., Johns Hopkins University
James E.K. Hildreth, M.D., Ph.D., University of California, Davis 
Tao Pan, Ph.D., University of Chicago
Sharad Ramanathan, Ph.D., Harvard University
David S. Schneider, Ph.D., Stanford University
Thanos Siapas, Ph.D., California Institute of Technology

2012
Source: NIH
Anne Brunet, Ph.D., Stanford University
Edward Marcotte, Ph.D., University of Texas at Austin
Hidde Ploegh, Ph.D., Whitehead Institute
Christina Smolke, Ph.D., Stanford University
Yi Tang, Ph.D., University of California
Doris Ying Tsao, Ph.D., California Institute of Technology,
Lihong V. Wang, Ph.D., Washington University in St. Louis
Chao-Ting Wu, Ph.D., Harvard University Medical School
Gary Yellen, Ph.D., Harvard University Medical School
Feng Zhang, Ph.D., Broad Institute

2013
Source: NIH
Amy Arnsten, Ph.D., Yale University, New Haven, CT
Edward S. Boyden, Ph.D., Massachusetts Institute of Technology, Boston, MA
Vadim N. Gladyshev, Ph.D., Brigham and Women's Hospital and Harvard Medical School, Boston, MA
Baljit S. Khakh, Ph.D., University of California Los Angeles, David Geffen School of Medicine, CA
Michael Z. Lin, M.D., Ph.D., Stanford University, Stanford, CA
Jay Shendure, M.D., Ph.D., University of Washington, Seattle, WA
Natalia A. Trayanova, Ph.D., The Johns Hopkins University, Baltimore, MD
Fan Wang, Ph.D., Duke University Medical Center, Durham, NC
Leor S Weinberger, Ph.D., Gladstone Institutes and University of California, San Francisco, CA
Xiaoliang Sunney Xie, Ph.D., Harvard University, Cambridge, MA
Rafael Yuste, M.D., Ph.D., Columbia University, New York, NY
Mark J Zylka, Ph.D., University of North Carolina, Chapel Hill, NC

2014
Source: NIH
Jayakrishna Ambati, M.D., University of Kentucky
Chenghua Gu, D.V.M., Ph.D., Harvard medical School
Cato T. Laurencin, M.D., Ph.D., University of Connecticut
Denise J. Montell, Ph.D., University of California Santa Barbara
Carl D. Novina, M.D., Ph.D., Dana-Farber Cancer Institute
Amy Palmer, Ph.D., University of Colorado
Dana Pe'er, Ph.D., Columbia University
Donna L. Spiegelman, Sc.D., Harvard School of Public Health
Sean Wu, M.D., Ph.D., Stanford University

2015
Source: 2015 NIH

Giovanni Bosco, Dartmouth Geisel School of Medicine
Jeffery S. Cox, University of California San Francisco
Matthew David Disney, The Scripps Research Institute
Zemer Gitai, Princeton University
Jonathon Howard, Yale University
Craig Montell, University of California Santa Barbara
Coleen T. Murphy, Princeton University
Gwendalyn J. Randolph, Washington University School of Medicine
Steven J. Schiff, The Pennsylvania State University
Hao Wu, Boston Children’s Hospital and Harvard Medical School
Tony Wyss-Coray, Stanford University School of Medicine and VA Palo Alto
Ryohei Yasuda, Max Planck Florida Institute for Neuroscience
Sheng Zhong, University of California San Diego

2016
Source: NIH

Kristin Baldwin, The Scripps Research Institute
Bradley Bernstein, Massachusetts General Hospital and Broad Institute
Michael Fischbach, University of California, San Francisco
Uri Hasson, Princeton University
Juan Carlos Izpisua Belmonte, The Salk Institute for Biological Studies
Nancy Kanwisher, Massachusetts Institute of Technology
Stephen D. Liberles, Harvard Medical School
Christine Mayr, Memorial Sloan Kettering Cancer Center
Joshua D. Rabinowitz, Princeton University
Meng Wang, Baylor College of Medicine
Sing Sing Way, Cincinnati Children’s Hospital
Seok-Hyun "Andy" Yun, Massachusetts General Hospital and Harvard Medical School

2017 
Source: NIH
 Hongjie Dai, Stanford University
 Amit Etkin, Stanford University
 Howard A. Fine, Weill Cornell College of Medicine
 Charles M. Lieber, Harvard University
 Jeffrey D. Macklis, Harvard University
 Luciano A. Marraffini, Rockefeller University
 Alex Schier, Harvard University
 Ramin Shiekhattar, University of Miami
 David A. Sinclair, Harvard Medical School
 Justin L. Sonnenburg, Stanford University
 Kay M. Tye, MIT
 Feng Zhang, Broad Institute, MIT

2018 
Source: NIH
 Janelle S. Ayres, Salk Institute
 Daniel A. Colón-Ramos, Yale University School of Medicine
 Christina Curtis, Stanford University School of Medicine
 Viviana Gradinaru, Caltech
 Jonathan Kipnis, University of Virginia School of Medicine
 Hyungbae Kwon, Max Planck Florida Institute for Neuroscience
 Michelle Monje, Stanford University
 Gabriel D. Victora, Rockefeller University
 Amy J. Wagers, Harvard Medical School
 Peng Yin, Harvard University

2019
Source: NIH
 Mark Andermann, Beth Israel Deaconess Medical Center, Harvard Medical School
 James Eberwine, University of Pennsylvania Perelman School of Medicine
 Jennifer H. Elisseeff, Johns Hopkins University
 Valentina Greco, Yale University
 Christophe Herman, Baylor College of Medicine
 Sun Hur, Boston Children’s Hospital
 Rob Knight, University of California San Diego
 Jin Hyung Lee, Stanford University
 Marina R. Picciotto, Yale University
 Hidde Ploegh, Boston Children's Hospital, Harvard Medical School
 Simon Scheuring, Weill Cornell Medicine

2020
Source: NIH
 Annelise E. Barron, Stanford University, Schools of Medicine and of Engineering
 Kathleen Collins, University of California at Berkeley
 Christopher D. Harvey, Harvard Medical School
 Peter S. Kim, Stanford University
 Brian Litt, University of Pennsylvania
 Shu-Bing Qian, Cornell University
 Susan M. Rosenberg, Baylor College of Medicine
 John Schoggins, University of Texas Southwestern Medical Center
 David Veesler, University of Washington School of Medicine
 Magdalena Zernicka-Goetz, California Institute of Technology and University of Cambridge

See also

 List of medicine awards

References

External links
Official website

National Institutes of Health
American science and technology awards
Medicine awards
Awards established in 2004